Charles Hart is an English lyricist, librettist and songwriter best known for his work on The Phantom of the Opera as well as a number of other musicals and operas for both stage and television.

Life and Works
Hart was born in London in 1961, the son of George Wilson Hart, an antiquarian book dealer, and Juliet Lavinia Hart (née Byam Shaw), actress. His maternal grand-parents, Glen Byam Shaw and Angela Baddeley, were actively working in theatre and music throughout his childhood. Hart began writing lyrics as a child, some of which were "dark and contemplative – precociously murderous and quite, quite feisty".  He went to school in Maidenhead over the same period when his grandmother was starring in a London stage production of Stephen Sondheim's A Little Night Music.  Hart went on to study music at Robinson College, Cambridge, followed by postgraduate studies at the Guildhall School of Music and Drama in music composition in 1984, when he attracted the attention of Andrew Lloyd Webber and Cameron Mackintosh.  Webber hired him as a lyricist for The Phantom of the Opera a year later, which opened in 1986.

In 1990, during Stephen Sondheim’s tenure as “Professor of Musical Theatre” at Oxford, Hart linked up with like-minded writers George Stiles, Anthony Drewe and Howard Goodall, and in 1992, they founded the Mercury Workshop.  The collaborative merged with the New Musical Alliance to become Mercury Musical Developments in 1999 and is today a registered charity whose patron is Stephen Sondheim.  Hart went on to collaborate with Howard Goodall on a number of successful musicals.

Selected works

Musical theatre
1984 – Book and music for Moll Flanders– competition entry to Vivian Ellis Award
1986 – Lyrics for Phantom of the Opera with music by Lloyd Webber
1989 – Lyrics for Aspects of Love (co-written with Don Black) with music by Lloyd Webber
1998 – Book and lyrics for The Kissing Dance with music by Howard Goodall
2001 – Book and lyrics for  The Dreaming  with music by Howard Goddall
2015 – Book and lyrics for  Bend It Like Beckham with music by Howard Goodall

Operas
1992 -  Libretto for The Vampyr, music by Heinrich Marschner, directed by Nigel Finch for the BBC
2014 - Libretto for Benvenuto Cellini, music by Hector Berlioz, performed by ENO, directed by Terry Gilliam
2018 – Libretto for Marx in London, music by Jonathan Dove, performed at Stadttheater Bonn

Songs
1998 – Lyrics and music for Love Songs, a song-cycle performed by Marie-Louise Clarke for BBC Radio
1999 – Lyrics for ‘’’The Years Rolled By’’’, music by Jake Heggie, sung by Kiri Te Kanawa and Frederica von Stade
2007 – Lyrics for Goodbye For Now music by Richard Rodney Bennett, sung by Claire Martin
2013 – Lyrics for Seventeen music by Claude-Michel Schönberg, sung by Russell Watson
2017 – Lyrics for ‘’’This Life’’’ original German version Michael Kunze and Sylvester Levay, performed by Pia Douwes

Film and Broadcast 
1987 – Lyrics and music for  Watching  for Granada TV, sung by Emma Wray
1989 – Lyrics and music for  Split Ends  for Granada TV, sung by Anita Dobson
1992 – Libretto for The Vampyr: A Soap Opera, a miniseries for BBC

Awards
Hart has received two Ivor Novello Awards. He was nominated twice for the Tony Award, Best Original Score, for Aspects of Love (1990) and The Phantom of the Opera (1988). He was also nominated for an Academy Award for writing the lyrics to a new song "Learn to be Lonely" which was sung by Minnie Driver over the final credits to the film version of The Phantom of the Opera.

References

External links

1961 births
Alumni of Robinson College, Cambridge
Alumni of the Guildhall School of Music and Drama
English musical theatre lyricists
Living people